3 Peas in a Pod,  is a 2013 Singaporean romantic drama film directed by Michelle Chong. The film was the acting debut of Jae Liew.

Plot
Singaporean Penny, Korean Peter, and Taiwanese Perry are schoolmates at an Australian University. Just before graduation, they decide to take a road trip together.

Cast
 Jae Liew as Penny Yang
 Alexander Lee Eusebio as Peter
 Calvin Chen as Perry
 Michelle Chong as hotel staff

Release
The film released in theatres in Singapore and Japan on 14 November 2013.

Reception
Gwendolyn Ng of My Paper rated the film 2.5 stars out of 5, writing "Chong's sophomore film turns out to be a rather bumpy ride. This is especially so when the plot takes an abrupt, miscalculated turn towards the end that leaves viewers bewildered." Boon Chan of The Straits Times rated the film 2 stars out of 5, criticising the characters, the casting and the final act of the film. Jocelyn Lee of The New Paper rated the film 2 stars out of 5, writing "The twist which happens way too abruptly is bound to leave viewers feeling mystified and unsatisified." Lin Mingwen of My Paper rated the film 2 stars out of 5, praising the first hour of the film, while criticising the final act.

References

External links
 

2013 films
Singaporean drama films